The March 2012 Damascus bombings were two large car bombs that exploded in front of the air intelligence and criminal security headquarters in the Syrian capital of Damascus. At least 27 people were reported killed and over a 140 injured in the fourth major bombing since the beginning of the uprising and the second in the city. As in previous cases, the opposition blamed the government for orchestrating attacks, while the government placed the blame on terrorists and foreign groups.

Background
The bombing came near the date of the one year anniversary of the 2011-2012 Syrian uprising. There had already been two bombings in Damascus and one in Aleppo. Another Aleppo car bombing came the next day, followed by a car bombing in Daraa.

Bombings
Two large car bombs exploded on 17 March 2012 at 7:30 AM in front of the air intelligence and criminal security headquarters in the Syrian capital of Damascus. At least 27 people were reported killed and over a 140 injured. 

The government placed the blame on terrorists and foreign groups, while the opposition blamed it for orchestrating attacks to divert attention from its atrocities.

Responsibility for the attack was claimed by the al-Nusra Front.

Perpetrators
al-Nusra Front is a jihadist group which also claims responsibility for the earlier al-Midan bombing and the Aleppo bombings.

See also
 List of bombings during the Syrian uprising (2011–present)
 1986 Damascus bombings

References 

Terrorist incidents in Damascus during the Syrian civil war
Car and truck bombings in Syria
Terrorist incidents in Syria in 2012
March 2012 events in Syria
Attacks on buildings and structures in Syria